Lee Tit (1913–1996) was a Chinese director who worked primarily in the Hong Kong film scene.

Early life 
In 1913, Lee was born in Guangdong, China.

Career 
Between 1936 and 1977 he directed over 70 films. Three of his films were named in the Hong Kong Film Awards' list of the Best 100 Chinese Motion Pictures. In the Face of Demolition (1953) placed 18th, The Purple Hairpin (1959) placed 51st, and Feast of a Rich Family (1959), which he co-directed with Lee Sun-Fung, Ng Wui and Lo Ji-Hung, placed 84th.

Filmography

Films 
This is a partial list of films.
 1936 House Number 66 (aka The Case of the Dismembered Body) - Director.
 1952 Girl in Red - Director.
 1953 In the Face of Demolition
 1963 The Millionaire's Daughter - Director

Awards 
 Star. Avenue of Stars. Tsim Sha Tsui waterfront in Hong Kong.

Personal life 
On 27 September 1996, Lee died in Hong Kong.

References

External links

Li Tie at the Chinese Movie Database
Lee Tit at Hong Kong Cinemagic

Film directors from Guangdong
Hong Kong film directors
1913 births
1996 deaths
Chinese film directors
Chinese emigrants to British Hong Kong